This Side is the Grammy-winning third album by the progressive bluegrass band Nickel Creek, released on Sugar Hill in the summer of 2002. It gained attention in indie rock circles due to the group's recording of a Pavement song, "Spit on a Stranger". Alison Krauss acted as a producer for the album.

Track listing

Chart performance

Weekly charts

Year-end charts

Personnel

Nickel Creek
Chris Thile – mandolin, bouzouki, guitar, strings, arranger, vocals, harmony vocals
Sara Watkins – fiddle, ukulele, guitar, strings, arranger, vocals, harmony vocals
Sean Watkins – guitar, arranger, vocals, harmony vocals

Other musicians
Byron House – upright bass
Edgar Meyer – upright bass
Robert Trujillo – upright bass on "Smoothie Song" video

Credits

Producer: Alison Krauss
Engineers: Gary Paczosa, Neal Cappellino, Jason Lehning, Tracy Martinson
Assistant engineers: Eric Bickel, Rob Clark, Thomas Johnson
Mixing: Gary Paczosa
Surround mix: Gary Paczosa
Mixing assistant: Eric Bickel
Mastering: Don Cobb, Eric Conn, Robert Hadley, Doug Sax
SACD mastering: Don Cobb, Eric Conn
Editing: Tracy Martinson
Production assistants: Jennie Billo, Tasha Thomas
Art direction: Wendy Stamberger
Design: Wendy Stamberger
Photography: John Chiasson
Illustrations: Terry Hoff
Assistant: Eric Bickel

References

External links
This Side at Nickel Creek's official website, with sound samples
Nickel Creek's New Side story at Rolling Stone

Nickel Creek albums
2002 albums
Grammy Award for Best Contemporary Folk Album
Sugar Hill Records albums
Albums produced by Alison Krauss